La romanziera e l'uomo nero (also known as La romanzesca e l'uomo nero) is an 1831 one-act farsa with music by Gaetano Donizetti and an Italian libretto by Domenico Gilardoni, possibly based on the 1819 play La donna dei romanzi by Augusto Bon. Other suggested sources include L'homme noir (1820) by Eugene Scribe  and Jean-Henri Dupin and Le coiffeur et le perruquier (1824) by Scribe, Édouard-Joseph-Ennemond Mazères and Charles Nombret Saint-Laurent.

Performance history 
The opera was premiered on 18 June 1831 at the Teatro del Fondo, Naples, and there was only one further performance.  The words and music of the arias and ensembles have survived, but the spoken dialogue has been lost.  The opera's music was performed in 1982 at the Camden Festival, and in Fermo in 1988.  In November 2000, staged performances took place in Rovigo with dialogue re-created by Michelangelo Zurletti from the Scribe plays on which the opera may have been based.

Of this work Ashbrook writes:
The plot is a satire on Romanticism: in the rondo-finale Antonina assures her father that she will give up willows, cypresses, urns and ashes, and take up more appropriate pursuits like singing and dancing and going to the opera.

He also points out that Filidoro's canzonetta is a parody of the Gondolier's song from Rossini's Otello.

Roles

List of musical numbers

Recordings

References
Notes

Cited sources
 Ashbrook, William (1982). Donizetti and His Operas. Cambridge University Press.  (hardcover).  (paperback). Snippet view at Google Books.
 Ashbrook, William; Hibberd, Sarah (2001). "Gaetano Donizetti", pp. 224–247 in The New Penguin Opera Guide, edited by Amanda Holden. New York: Penguin Putnam. .
 
 Osborne, Charles (1994). The Bel Canto Operas of Rossini, Donizetti, and Bellini. Portland, Oregon: Amadeus Press.  .
 Weinstock, Herbert (1963). Donizetti and the World of Opera in Italy, Paris, and Vienna in the First Half of the Nineteenth Century, New York: Pantheon Books. .

External links
  (original at the Naples Conservatorio San Pietro a Majella)

Operas by Gaetano Donizetti
Italian-language operas
1831 operas
One-act operas
Operas